Messier 49 (also known as M49 or NGC 4472) is a giant elliptical galaxy about  away in the equatorial constellation of Virgo. This galaxy was discovered by astronomer Charles Messier in 1777.

As an elliptical galaxy, Messier 49 has the physical form of a radio galaxy, but it only has the radio emission of a normal galaxy. From the detected radio emission, the core region has roughly 1053 erg (1046 J or 1022 YJ) of synchrotron energy. X-ray emissions shows a structure to the north of Messier 49 that resembles a bow shock. To the southwest of the core, the luminous outline of the galaxy can be traced out to a distance of 260 kpc. The only supernova event seen within it is SN 1969Q, discovered in 1969.

This galaxy has many globular clusters: estimated to be about 5,900. This is far more than the roughly 200 orbiting the Milky Way, but dwarfed by the 13,450 orbiting the supergiant elliptical galaxy Messier 87. On average, the globular clusters of M49 are about 10 billion years old. Between 2000 and 2009, strong evidence for a stellar mass black hole was discovered in one. A second candidate was announced in 2011.

Messier 49 was the first member of the Virgo Cluster of galaxies to be discovered. It is the most luminous member of that cluster and more luminous than any galaxy closer to the Earth. This galaxy forms part of the smaller Virgo B subcluster 4.5° away from the dynamic center of the Virgo Cluster, centered on Messier 87. Messier 49 is gravitationally interacting with the dwarf irregular galaxy UGC 7636.

See also
 List of Messier objects

References and footnotes

External links
 
 SEDS: Elliptical Galaxy M49
 Black hole found in a star cluster in M49
 

Messier 049
Messier 049
Messier 049
049
Messier 049
07629
41220
134
17710219